Fernando Cardiñanos O.F.M. Obs. (born 29 May 1731 in Vitoria-Gasteiz – July 1794) was a Spanish clergyman and bishop for the Roman Catholic Diocese of Comayagua. He became ordained in 1788. He was appointed bishop in 1788. He died in July 1794, at the age of 63.

References

Spanish Roman Catholic priests
1731 births
1794 deaths
People from Vitoria-Gasteiz
Observant Franciscan bishops
18th-century Roman Catholic bishops in Honduras
Spanish Roman Catholic bishops in Central America
Roman Catholic bishops of Comayagua